The Mannheim/Ludwigshafen tramway network is a metre-gauge transport network of tramways focused on the cities of Mannheim and Ludwigshafen am Rhein, and connected to Heidelberg and Weinheim via the Upper Rhine Railway Company (OEG), in the Rhine Neckar Area of Germany.

Opened in 1878, the network has been operated since 2005 by Rhein-Neckar-Verkehr GmbH (RNV), and is integrated in the Verkehrsverbund Rhein-Neckar (VRN).

See also
List of town tramway systems in Germany
Trams in Germany

References

External links

 

Rail transport in Mannheim
Ludwigshafen
Transport in Rhineland-Palatinate
Mannheim Ludwigshafen
Metre gauge railways in Germany
750 V DC railway electrification
Mannheim